Terry Jones  (born 1945) is a British graphic designer, art director, photographer, book- and magazine-editor. He is best known as co-founder of the British, street-style magazine i-D in 1980.

Early life and career
Terry Jones was born on 2 September 1945 in Northampton, England. He was a student of commercial art at West of England College of Art in Bristol. During college Jones was already working on two magazines: Circuit and Hip Hip Bullshit Dip. After his first two-year diploma, he was persuaded by the head of graphics Richard Hollis to continue studies, but soon after he left without a grade in solidarity to Hollis who had resigned due to a lack of support from the school. Hollis suggested Jones should apply to the Royal College of Art, but being reluctant during the interview he wasn't accepted.

Jones then worked as an assistant to the graphic designer Ivan Dodd, until becoming assistant art director at Good Housekeeping, from 1968 until 1970, and art director for Vanity Fair from 1970 until 1971.

British Vogue 
From 1972 until 1977 Terry was the art director for British Vogue. Terry was present at the magazine under the direction of then-editor, Beatrix Miller, stating: "Beatrix Miller was amazing. She let me get away with breaking all sorts of rules – covers, notoriously." One of his most notorious covers was the "Green Jelly one" from February 1977. Created by Terry and Grace Coddington and shot by Willie Christie, the cover was deemed adventurous for the time – even for today. Terry has admitted in an interview with SHOWstudio that the cover was nearly taken off the press, even after it had been approved by Vogue board at the time (which included Terry Jones, Beatrix Miller and the-then managing director of British Vogue).

In 1977 Jones had commissioned the photographer Steve Johnston for a head-to-toe-portrait series of punk youth on London's King's Road. The series was considered too radical for publication in British Vogue, so Jones used it for his book Not Another Punk Book (Aurum Press). This kind of documentary approach to fashion photography, then labelled the Straight-up, became one of the trade marks of Terry Jones' own upcoming publication i-D.

Terry Jones worked as a freelancer all over Europe until 1979, as a consultant for the German edition of Vogue, for the magazines Donna and Sportswear Europe, for selected issues of Italian Vogue, as well as a creative director for the Italian fashion label, Fiorucci. He also designed and edited books, worked on advertising campaigns, and is credited as graphic designer and photographer on several record covers.

i-D
In 1980 Terry Jones, his wife Tricia Jones, and Blitz kid Perry Haines founded the magazine i-D. The first issue was hand-stapled photocopies in the style of a fanzine with little distribution. But over the years i-D developed to a glossy fashion magazine with global impact, while still keeping its cutting-edge view on fashion and youth culture.<ref name="Shapers of the 80s">{{cite web|title=1980, Your identity counts more than fashion|url=http://shapersofthe80s.com/the-face-i-d-media/1980-‘i-d-counts-more-than-fashion’/}}</ref>

Besides of the abbreviation for 'identity', the name i-D refers to 'Informat Design', Terry Jones' studio, later on re-branded as 'Instant Design'.

Jones is author and editor of books related to the magazine like i-D Covers 1980–2010 (2010), SMILE i-D: Fashion and Style: the Best from 20 Years of i-D (2001), SOUL i-D (2008), or i-DENTITY: An Exhibition Celebrating 25 Years of i-D (2006); as well as a curator of travelling exhibitions, and furthermore running a (probably now defunct) record label under the eponymous name.

 The "i-D Wink" 
Terry has always said that "'i-D' should be recognised as the first 'emoticon'; at least three years before [the first] claims made in 1983." The original "i-D" logo was painted by hand and was based on the typeface "Futura Demi Bold" and was modified to fit into the i-D star logo so the dot of the lower case 'i' could be split into two semi-circles. This was three years before Terry bought his first computer: an Apple IIe.

 Awards 
In 2013 at the British Fashion Awards Terry and Tricia Jones were honoured with the "Outstanding Achievement Award" for their work on i-D.

Other
In 1980 Jones and Perry Haines directed the video Careless Memories for the band Duran Duran.

 Publications
(as author or editor, and graphic designer)The Tree with John Fowles, and Frank Horvat (1979)  Women on Women (1979)Not Another Punk Book (1980) Private Viewing: Contemporary Erotic Photography (1983)Getting Jobs in Graphic Design (1989)i-Deas of a Decade (1990)Wink instant design: a manual of graphic techniques (1990)Family Future Positive with Tony Elliott (1985)Catching The Moment (1997)
 SMILEi-D: Fashion and Style: the Best from 20 Years of i-D (2001)Fashion Now with Susie Rushton (2003, paperback edition 2006) i-DENTITY: An Exhibition Celebrating 25 Years of i-D (2006)Fashion Now 2 with Susie Rushton (2005, paperback edition 2008)SOUL i-D (2008)i-D Covers 1980–2010 (2010)SOUL i-D: Chinese Edition (2012)Vivienne Westwood (2012)Yohji Yamamoto (2012)100 Contemporary Fashion Designers (2013)Rei Kawakubo (2013)Rick Owens (2013)Raf Simons (2013)

ExhibitionsFamily Future Positive (1995, London)2001 minus 3 (1998, at Florence Biennale) Beyond Price (1999ff)SMILEi-D (2001ff)i-DENTITY: An Exhibition Celebrating 25 Years of i-D (Fashion & Textile Museum, London, São Paulo Fashion Week, Chelsea Art Museum New York, Cultural Centre Hong Kong, Spiral Hall Tokyo, Long March Space Beijing) (2006ff)Soul i-D (2008)Soul i-D: Beijing (2012)

Personal life
Terry Jones was born in 1945, Northampton.  Moved with his mother and his sister Mavis Elizabeth (born 1946) to the countryside in the West Country. His father, an RAF soldier, left the family before Mavis Elizabeth was born. In 1962 Terry attended Art School in Bristol.

In 1968 Terry Jones married Tricia. They have two children, Kayt Jones and Matthew Jones, who both are working as photographers. The Jones reside in London and Wales.

References

External links
 Jones' contributor page on Showstudio.com
Interview with John L. Waters for Eye
Terry Jones on Vice.com (owner of i-D'' since 2012)
Jones, Terry. (1 of 10). Oral History of British Photography

British graphic designers
British art directors
Photographers from Northamptonshire
British book editors
British magazine editors
1945 births
Living people
Artists from Northampton
Members of the Order of the British Empire